Pacific Coast Rambler is the second album by the Original Harmony Ridge Creekdippers, released in 1998. As with their first release, it is a home-made recording with the focus on Mark Olson.

Pacific Coast Rambler was re-released in 2001 by Koch Records.

Reception

Writing for Allmusic, music critic Brian Beatty wrote of the album; "This is intimate music that recalls old-time traditions and manages to avoid the cloying earnestness that often afflicts folkies and unplugged rockers."

Track listing
 "Give My Heart To You" (Mark Olson) – 3:00
 "Kai's Bristlecone Waltz" (Mike Russell) – 2:50
 "Pacific Coast Rambler" (Mabel Allbright, Olson, Tennessee Williams) – 3:50
 "Owen's Valley Day" (Olson) – 2:21
 "Bellflower" (Olson) – 2:34
 "Prayer Of The Changing Leaf" (Allbright, Tennessee Williams) – 2:26
 "Elijah" (Allbright, Marc Ford) – 2:10
 "Welcome Home Jim" (Olson) – 2:45
 "Golden Street Locker" (Allbright, Olson) – 3:15
 "Call The Light" (Olson) – 2:48

Personnel
Mark Olson – vocals, guitar, dulcimer, banjo, conga
Victoria Williams (credited as "Mabel Allbright") – background vocals
Mike Russell – organ, bass, fiddle, harmonica, accordion, bongos, viola, vocals
Marc Ford – lead and rhythm guitars

Production notes
Mark Olson – producer
Joe Gastwirt – mastering 
Tony Mason – photography

References

1998 albums
Original Harmony Ridge Creekdippers albums